Celeribacter indicus is a bacterium from the genus of Celeribacter which has been isolated from deep sea sediments from the Indian Ocean.Celeribacter indicus can degrade polycyclic aromatic hydrocarbons.

References

Rhodobacteraceae
Bacteria described in 2014